Serri (Latin: Biora) is a comune (municipality) in the Province of South Sardinia in the Italian region Sardinia, located about  north of Cagliari.

Serri borders the following municipalities: Escolca, Gergei, Isili, Mandas, Nurri.

Demographic evolution

References

Cities and towns in Sardinia